The TAI Hürjet is a single-engine, tandem seat, supersonic advanced trainer and light combat aircraft, under development by Turkish Aerospace Industries (TAI). The first flight of the aircraft is planned for 18 March 2023.

The Turkish Air Force intends to use the design to replace the Northrop T-38 Talon in the trainer role and also to supplement the General Dynamics F-16 Fighting Falcon for close air support. The aircraft is also planned to replace the Northrop F-5 used by the Turkish Stars aerobatic team. A naval version of the aircraft may also be developed. The company also plans to pursue export orders to countries looking to replace older trainer and ground attack aircraft.

Design and development

The project was initiated by TAI in August 2017 using its own financial resources. A mock-up was displayed at the 2018 Farnborough International Airshow.

On 22 July 2018 the Turkish Under-secretariat for Defence Industries announced that the Turkish Air Force had signed an agreement with TAI, giving the project official status to move development forward.

 the aircraft did not have an engine selected, although the Eurojet EJ200 and the General Electric F404-GE-102 were under consideration to the power the design.

Capabilities are planned to include air-to-air refuelling, fly-by-wire with parameter limiting, built in auxiliary power unit, night vision goggle-compatible cockpit, head-up display and an integrated helmet display system.

The company completed the first test simulator for the aircraft in September 2020. Designated the Hurjet 270, the artificial intelligence based simulator will incorporate feedback from the test pilots to change the flight control algorithms and the avionics software during the flight test process. 

The company has developed simulator avionics, flight control systems, screen, cockpit and communication systems for the simulator.

Turkey has invited Malaysia to join the Hürjet project, in the role of producing some parts for the aircraft. While Malaysia has some experience developing composite materials, it has never designed and built any aircraft.

Variants 
Trainer
Advanced supersonic jet trainer version

Light Combat Aircraft
Version for close air support and armed air policing roles. The combat variant will carry locally produced air-to-air missiles and air-to-ground bombs.

Specifications (projected)

See also

References

External links

Single-engined jet aircraft
Turkish military trainer aircraft
Shoulder-wing aircraft
Proposed aircraft of Turkey
Hurjet